Grant, California may refer to:
Grant, Inyo County, California
Grant, Sonoma County, California